Frederic Mayer Bird (1838–1908) was an American clergyman, educator, and hymnologist born in Philadelphia, Pennsylvania.  He graduated from the University of Pennsylvania in 1857 and the Union Theological Seminary in 1860, and from 1860 to 1867 was a Lutheran minister.  In 1868 he took orders in the Episcopal Church.

He edited some religious publications, and published The story of our Christianity (1893).

He also wrote A Pessimist;  in Theory and Practice (1888) under the pen-name "Robert Timsol".

He also wrote and edited "Heroes and Martyrs of Christianity," published in 1897.

See also
List of University of Pennsylvania people

References

External links
 
 
 

American Episcopal theologians
American Episcopal clergy
1838 births
1908 deaths
Clergy from Philadelphia
Union Theological Seminary (New York City) alumni
University of Pennsylvania alumni
19th-century American Episcopalians
19th-century American clergy